Joseph Whitaker Thompson (August 19, 1861 – January 7, 1946) was a United States circuit judge of the United States Court of Appeals for the Third Circuit and previously was a United States district judge of the United States District Court for the Eastern District of Pennsylvania.

Education and career

Born in Stroudsburg, Pennsylvania, Thompson graduated from the University of Pennsylvania Law School with a Bachelor of Laws in 1887. He was an Assistant United States Attorney for the Eastern District of Pennsylvania from 1900 to 1904, and then the United States Attorney for that district until 1912.

Federal judicial service

Thompson was nominated by President William Howard Taft on June 5, 1912, to a seat on the United States District Court for the Eastern District of Pennsylvania vacated by Judge John Bayard McPherson. He was confirmed by the United States Senate on June 16, 1912, and received his commission on July 16, 1912. His service terminated on February 3, 1931, due to his elevation to the Third Circuit.

Thompson was nominated by President Herbert Hoover on December 4, 1930, to the United States Court of Appeals for the Third Circuit, to a new seat authorized by 46 Stat. 538. He was confirmed by the Senate on January 22, 1931, and received his commission on January 29, 1931. He assumed senior status on May 1, 1938. His service terminated on January 7, 1946, due to his death.

References

Sources
 

1861 births
1946 deaths
University of Pennsylvania Law School alumni
United States Attorneys for the Eastern District of Pennsylvania
Judges of the United States District Court for the Eastern District of Pennsylvania
United States district court judges appointed by William Howard Taft
Judges of the United States Court of Appeals for the Third Circuit
United States court of appeals judges appointed by Herbert Hoover
20th-century American judges
Assistant United States Attorneys